The 1999 National Soccer League Grand Final, also known as the 1999 Ericsson Cup Grand Final, was held on 30 May 1999 between South Melbourne and Sydney United at Olympic Park Stadium. South Melbourne gained home advantage as although Sydney United finished higher in the regular season, South Melbourne won the major semi-final against them two weeks prior. Mile Sterjovski scored first for United as they went up 1–0 at the half time break, however, a goal from Paul Trimboli and a brace from John Anastasiadis sealed South Melbourne's second consecutive championship and fourth overall. Goran Lozanovski won the Joe Marston Medal.

Background

Sydney United finished the season with the minor premiership through a 3–1 win over the Adelaide Sharks on the final day of the season. South Melbourne finished one point from first place.

Route to the final

League Standings

Finals Bracket

Match

Details

Post-match

The match served as a qualifier for the 1999 Oceania Club Championship. South Melbourne qualified easily for the championship final, conceding just one goal in the group stage and defeating Tahitian club A.S. Vénus 3–0 in the semifinal. They qualified for the 2000 FIFA Club World Championship with a 5–0 win in the final. At the Club World Championship, South Melbourne finished fourth in their group, eighth overall, without recording a win and scoring one goal.

References

1999 in Australian soccer
NSL Grand Finals
Soccer in Melbourne
South Melbourne FC matches
Sydney United 58 FC matches